Appius Claudius Pulcher (Latin: APP•CLAVDIVS•C•F•APP•N•PVLCHER) was a Roman politician of the 2nd century BC.

Life
Son of Gaius Claudius Pulcher (who was consul in 177 BC), he was elected consul for 143 BC, and, to obtain a pretext for a triumph, attacked the Salassi, an Alpine tribe. He was at first defeated, but afterwards, following the directions of the Sibylline Books, gained a victory. On his return the celebration of the triumph was refused; but he held a triumph at his own expense, and when one of the tribunes attempted to drag him from his car, his daughter Claudia, one of the Vestal Virgins, walked by his side up to the capital. Next year he was an unsuccessful candidate for the censorship, though he afterwards held that office with Quintus Fulvius Nobilior, probably in 136 BC. He allied with Tiberius Gracchus who married his daughter Claudia. Appius backed Tiberius' land reform bill and in 133 BC with Tiberius and Tiberius' brother, Gaius Gracchus, was chosen commissioner for the division of the lands. Their post allowed them to survey the ager publicus, publicly owned land that Tiberius wanted to distribute to citizens who had lost their property. Another faction in the Senate opposed them and Tiberius was assassinated in 133 BC. Appius was the enemy of Scipio Aemilianus. He died shortly after Tiberius Gracchus, probably in 130 BC. He was one of the Salii, an augur, and princeps senatus. Cicero says that his style of speaking was fluent and vehement. He married Antistia. His great-granddaughter was Clodia.

Family tree

Notes

References
This entry incorporates public domain text originally from:
William Smith (ed.), Dictionary of Greek and Roman Biography and Mythology, 1870.

2nd-century births
130s BC deaths
2nd-century BC Roman augurs
2nd-century BC Roman consuls
2nd-century BC Roman praetors
Roman censors
Appius consul 611 AUC
Year of birth uncertain
Year of death uncertain